An election for President of Israel was held in the Knesset on 19 April 1978.

History
Ephraim Katzir, who was elected President of Israel in 1973, declined to stand for a second term due to his wife's illness. Yitzhak Navon ran unopposed for the position.

Navon's term began on the day of the election. He held office until 1983, when Chaim Herzog was elected as  President.

Results

References

President
Single-candidate elections
Presidential elections in Israel
Israel